Dr Ram Manohar Lohia Park is developed by the Lucknow Development Authority in the Vipin Khand area of Gomti Nagar locality in the memory of great socialist Dr. Ram Manohar Lohia. The total area of the park is 76 acres.

The Courtyard
There are total four courtyards. All the entrances have ticket counters.

Parking
All the entrance courtyards are equipped with ample parking space with a capacity to park 60-100 vehicles each.

Public Utility Area
All the four entry points of the park have public utility block

Main Navigation Path (4.5 wide and 1km long)
Starting from the South-East corner of the park, the Main Navigation Path goes through the centre and ends at the North-East corner, measuring around 1 kilometre in length and 4.50 metres in width. The Main Navigation Path which is made up of Kota stones flooring also has a 50 cm strip in the middle of the path where seasonal flowers are grown. Special architectural lights on designer polls can be seen all around the navigation path.

Light Beam Pathways
Right from the entrance there are pathways in various directions of the park along with natural mounds, flower nursery and other areas. It looks like a light spreading in various directions. The total length of these light beam path is 2.7 kilometres and it is made up of vitrified tile along with white sandstone strips in the middle.

Semi-circular path
The semi-circual path situated near the main memorial area is almost 500 metres long, also six memory columns and walls are situated along the semi-circular path. The walls have been engraved with the thoughts of Dr. Ram Manohar Lohiya, while the columns have life and work of Mr. Madhu Limye, Mr. Raj Narayan, Mr. Karpuri Thakur, Mr. Badri Vishal Pitti, Mama Baleshwar Dayal and Mr. Ram Sewak Yadav, engraved on them.

Synthetic Jogging Track
There are two state of the art synthetic jogging tracks in the park. The first track is of 340 metres in length and 2.70 metre wide, while the second track is 440 metres long and 3 metre wide.

Jogging Track
There are two jogging tracks in the park which are made up of sand soil. The first track is 365 metres long and 2.4 metres wide, while the second track is 400 metres long and 2.4 metres wide.

Acupressure track
There is also a modern acupressure track near the entrance courtyard number two. The length of this acupressure track is 100 metres and width is 2.40 metres.

Water Body
A lake of area 15,277 square metre is situated in the background of the idol of Dr Ram Manohar Lohia. The flooring of the lake is made up of rectified glazed ceramic tiles. There are four floating fountains in the lake and each fountain is 12 metres.

Fish/Duck Pond
The Fish and Duck Pond is divided in two parts. In the first part there are multi-colour small fishes, while the other part is reserved for ducks.

Swings and Benches
There are many types of latest swings installed in the park for the entertainment of children, also benches are installed to provide rest to the park goers.

Open Exercise Area
Keeping in view, the health and fitness of the people coming to park there seven machines installed in the open area near synthetic jogging track.

Amphitheatre
To cater the need of social and cultural functions, there is a stage with a main diameter of 30 metres. This amphitheatre is situated near the entrance courtyard number two. Clock Tower is also located near this amphitheatre. There is a provision of reserving this amphitheatre in two categories. First category is Non Commercial and under this category the rent is 11,000 Rs per day. While the second category is Commercial, where one has to pay 21,000 Rs per day.
Dr. Lohia Memorial Column

Keeping in mind the principles of Dr Ram Manohar Lohia's four pillar rule, four massive columns of 25 metre height each are constructed.

Flower Garden
Just near the main memorial area a flower garden is located in the area of 2 acres. This garden is always blooming with seasonal flowers, also there is a baradari located in the middle of the garden.

Rain Water Harvesting
A unique system for Rain Water Harvesting has been installed in the park. A recharge trench of 805 metres and 29 deep bores have been installed to cater to the Rain Water Harvesting system.

Tree Plantation
Mainly covered with green trees and flowers, Dr Ram Manohar Lohia Park houses more than 50 different species of trees. Taking both small and big trees in count, there are almost 15000 trees planted in the park. Also 2 lac square ft green lawn is developed in the park. The species of the trees planted in the park are:-

References

Gardens in Lucknow
Memorials to Ram Manohar Lohia